Multilevel or multi-level may refer to:
 A hierarchy, a system where items are arranged in an "above-below" relation.
 A system that is composed of several layers.
 Bombardier MultiLevel Coach, a passenger rail car by Bombardier.

See also